Paradise Hotel (also known as Hotel Rai, Хотел Рай) is a 2010 Bulgarian documentary film directed by Sophia Tzavella. It depicts the lives of Roma living in an apartment block in a village in Yambol Province, Bulgaria.

The film received the FIPRESCI award for a film in the International selection at the 13th Thessaloniki International Film Festival.

External links

2010 films
Bulgarian documentary films
2010s Bulgarian-language films
2010 documentary films
Documentary films about Romani people
Romani in Bulgaria